The Bomb Pop is a frozen confection currently manufactured by Wells Enterprises. The original flavor contains cherry, lime, and blue raspberry flavorings. As of 2015, there are nine main Bomb Pop flavors. The current Bomb Pop flavors are Original, Fruit Bomb, Watermelon, Hawaiian Punch, Warheads, Jolly Rancher, Original Sugar Free, Banana Fudge, Lemonade, Tongue Splashers and Nerds.

History
The Bomb Pop was invented by James S. Merritt and D.S. Abernethy in Kansas City Missouri on July 30, 1955. In 1971 Bomb Pop was trademarked.  When D.S Abernethy's company Merritt Foods closed down in 1991, Wells' Dairy bought the business, including Bomb Pops.

In 1999, Stephen Labaton of The New York Times used bombpop.com as an example of why there needs to be new rules to protect children's privacy. Any child who wanted to win a Nintendo Game Boy had to fill out their personal information, including their address.

In 2003, The Walt Disney Company made a deal with Wells' Dairy to release Buzz Lightyear Bomb Pops.

Several competitors sell similar looking popsicles, with some litigation by a competitor in 2014, which was eventually dismissed.

Blue Bunny celebrated Bomb Pops' 50th anniversary in 2005 by starting a sweepstakes. The sweepstakes included giving a trip to Disneyland to two winners and giving 50 winners a Game Boy Advance. The 50th anniversary was also the start of National Bomb Pop Day which is celebrated on the last Thursday in June.

References

External links
 

Products introduced in 1955
Brand name frozen desserts